Jackie Warner (born 1968), is an American fitness trainer.

Jackie Warner may also refer to:
Jackie Warner (baseball) (born 1943), baseball player

See also 
Jack Warner (disambiguation)
John Warner (disambiguation)